Parivaar is a 1987 Indian Hindi-language film directed by Shashilal K. Nair, starring Mithun Chakraborty, Meenakshi Sheshadri, Aruna Irani, Jagdeep, Vikram Gokhale and Johnny Walker.

Songs
"Tu Nache Main Gaoon" - Anuradha Paudwal, Suresh Wadkar
"Baat Pate Ki Kahe Madaari" - Kishore Kumar, Kavita Krishnamurthy
"Cham Cham Chanda Hai" - Kavita Krishnamurthy, Anupama Deshpande, Baby Tabassum
"Aankhon Aankhon Me" - Kavita Krishnamurthy, Mohammed Aziz
"Zindagi Ek Dard Hai" - Nitin Mukesh
"Ram Bhakt Hanuman" - Kavita Krishnamurthy

Cast
Mithun Chakraborty as Birju Madari 
Meenakshi Sheshadri as  Anita 
Shakti Kapoor as Avinash 
Baby Guddu as Bobby 
Master Makrand as Bittu 
Aruna Irani as Mangala 
Anoop Kumar as Dinesh 
Vikram Gokhale as Pratap 
Mukri as Banwari 
Johnny Lever  
Vikas Anand as Childless Father 
Raj Tilak as Nagoba - Bandit Boss 
Beena Banerjee as Childless Mother
Shashi Kiran as Announcer 
K.K. Raj  as Bandit - Driver who killed advocate 
Sunil Dhawan as Doctor 
Jayant Dave   
Jagdeep as Constable Hukumat Singh 
Sadhana Singh as Bobby's mother

References

External links

Parivaar on The A.V. Club
Parivaar on TV Guide

1980s Hindi-language films
Indian drama films
Films scored by Laxmikant–Pyarelal
1987 drama films
Hindi-language drama films
Films about dogs
Films about pets
Films about monkeys